Patrick Johansson (born March 29, 1976, in Falun, Sweden) is a Swedish drummer.

Currently, Johansson is the drummer and founding member of American/ Brazilian/ Swedish power metal NorthTale.

Jonhansson was the drummer for Yngwie Malmsteen's backing band from 2001 to 2014 becoming the longest-playing drummer in the band. After left Yngwie's band, Johansson toured with different bands, including Without Grief, Stormwind, W.A.S.P., Vinnie Moore, few gigs with Sabaton and  recorded with different artists including the Ecuadorian guitarist Hittar Cuesta album Dream Machine (2013), the American heavy metal band Spelled Moon, with Neo-Classical shredder Chris Impelliteri on his "Nature Of The Beast" album, and performed in House Of Lords video "The Both Of Us".

Johansson currently resides in West Palm Beach, Florida. His favorite band is Kiss, and he has tattoos of all 4 original band members.

External links

References

Swedish heavy metal drummers
1976 births
Living people
21st-century drummers
Yngwie J. Malmsteen's Rising Force members